Khrystyna Yudkina (born 4 December 1984) is a Ukrainian racewalking athlete. Representing Ukraine at the 2019 World Athletics Championships, she placed sixth in the women's 50 kilometres walk.

References

External links
 

Ukrainian female racewalkers
1984 births
Living people
World Athletics Championships athletes for Ukraine